Kaplan International is a division of education company Kaplan Inc., a wholly owned subsidiary of Graham Holdings Company, formerly known as The Washington Post Company. Kaplan International is headquartered in London and consists of a number of global education businesses including Kaplan International Pathways and Kaplan International Languages. Kaplan International Pathways has partnerships with over 40 universities worldwide and prepares 20,000 international students for university each year. Kaplan International Languages provides English courses, as well as French and German courses after acquiring Alpadia Language Schools in 2019, and it offers a wide range of courses at locations in the UK, Ireland, USA, Canada, Australia, New Zealand, France, Germany, Switzerland and Spain.  As a result of government-imposed travel restrictions arising from the COVID-19 pandemic, Kaplan International's revenue fell 13% in 2020 to US$654 million, although still accounted for half of Kaplan Inc.’s total revenue in that year.

History
Kaplan opened its first university pathway college in 2005 on the campus of Nottingham Trent University in UK, and Kaplan International Colleges grew two years later with the opening of two new International Colleges at Russell Group institutions, the University of Glasgow and the University of Liverpool.  It expanded globally in 2007 with the addition of an on-campus pathway with Northeastern University in Boston in the United States, and the acquisition of a pathway college for the University of Adelaide, one of Australia's Group of Eight universities.

In 2007, Kaplan Inc. expanded its group of English language schools mainly based in the United States by acquiring Aspect Education, a global chain of 19 schools across six English-speaking countries, based in London. Aspect Education traced its origins back to 1963, and had grown by the acquisition of two other English language school chains, Angloworld Travel and International Language Academies. Aspect CEO, David Jones, retained leadership of the combined entity, Kaplan Aspect, which was launched in September 2007.

Kaplan Aspect grew its global network in 2008 and 2009 with a number of acquisitions of English language schools in Australia, Canada, UK and USA.  In 2009, Kaplan Aspect was merged into Kaplan International Colleges, with David Jones leading the new division as CEO.

In 2012, Kaplan International wholly acquired two international student recruitment agencies; BEO Limited in Japan, and Hands On Education Consultants in Thailand. Kaplan CEO, David Jones became responsible for all transnational programmes (students travelling to study) as well as Kaplan Asia Pacific following the departure of Mark Coggins, its former CEO.

Kaplan International moved into the UK secondary school sector in 2015 with the acquisition of Mander Portman Woodward, a sixth form college group with schools in London, Cambridge and Birmingham.

In 2019, Kaplan International English changed its name to Kaplan International Languages, after acquiring the Swiss-owned company Alpadia Language Schools and partnering with Enforex, one of the largest Spanish language education businesses in Spain and Latin America, enabling it to offer language courses in English, French, German and Spanish.

Kaplan International also acquired ESL Education Group in 2019, the largest language agency in Europe. ESL is headquartered in Switzerland and places over 25,000 students in language programs every year.

Kaplan International Languages schools
Kaplan International Languages has a total of 39 schools - 35 English as a foreign language and EAP schools and 4 French and German schools in 9 countries. They are located in the following destinations:
Australia: Adelaide, Brisbane, Melbourne, Perth, and Sydney
Canada: Toronto and Vancouver
England: Bath, Bournemouth, Cambridge, Liverpool, London( Covent Garden and Leicester Square), Manchester, Oxford, and Torquay
Ireland: Dublin
Scotland: Edinburgh
New Zealand: Auckland
United States: Berkeley, Boston (Harvard Square), Chicago, Golden West College, Los Angeles Westwood and Whittier College, Miami, New York Central Park, Philadelphia, Portland, Oregon, San Diego, San Francisco, Santa Barbara, Seattle, Seattle Downtown and Highline Community College and Washington, D.C.
France: Lyon
Germany: Berlin and Freiburg
Switzerland: Montreux
30+ Schools

Kaplan International Languages offers Study 30+ at four of their English schools. The Study 30+ locations are New York Central Park, London Leicester Square, Liverpool and Toronto.

Kaplan International Languages also sells Spanish courses at 4 Enforex-owned schools in Barcelona, Madrid, Malaga and Valencia in Spain.

Kaplan International Languages courses
Kaplan International Languages offers a wide range of English, French, German and Spanish as a foreign language courses varying in duration and intensity. They also offer exam preparation courses for TOEFL, IELTS, GMAT, Cambridge, DELF/DALF, TELC, Goethe and more. 
Students can also combine internship or paid work placement with language classes in some destinations.

Flexible courses allow students to tailor the duration and the intensity of the course to their personal needs. Business English courses combine English language tuition with business-specific English lessons. Long-term courses are ideal for students who want to experience living abroad and achieve an advanced level of language fluency.

Kaplan International Pathways
Kaplan International Pathways is one of the five largest global providers of university pathway programs for international students.  It offers programs for students to enter UK, USA and Australian university degree courses at undergraduate, postgraduate and doctorate level. Successful completion at the required level guarantees entrance to one of more than 1,000 degree courses at the following partner universities:

Arizona State University, USA
Aston University, UK 
Bournemouth University, UK 
City University London, UK 
Cranfield University, UK 
Massey University, New Zealand 
Murdoch University, Australia
Nottingham Trent University, UK 
Pace University, USA
Queen Mary University London, UK 
Simmons University, USA
The University of Connecticut, USA
The University of Tulsa, USA
University of Adelaide, Australia 
University of Birmingham, UK 
University of Brighton, UK 
University of Bristol, UK 
University of Essex, UK 
University of Glasgow, UK 
University of Liverpool, UK 
University of Newcastle, Australia 
University of Nottingham, UK 
University of Westminster, UK 
University of the West of England, UK 
University of York, UK 

In 2017, Kaplan International Pathways, in collaboration with the Higher Education Policy Institute, published a report on the impact of Brexit on demand from international students for UK universities, which estimated there could be a loss of 31,000 EU students per year if higher fees were introduces and access to loans was removed.  It also highlighted the uncertainty that Brexit created for international students, increasing the likelihood of them choosing to study in other countries.

Accommodation
Kaplan International has invested tens of millions of pounds on a number of accommodation and teaching facilities in the United Kingdom in collaboration with its partner universities, including student residences in Glasgow  and Nottingham, and live-learn facilities in Bournemouth  and Liverpool.

Accreditation
Kaplan International has worldwide accreditation for teaching English. 
Australia: NEAS Australia
Canada: CAPLS
Ireland: ACELS
New Zealand: NZQA
UK: British Council BAC accreditation for foundation, pre-masters and diploma programs
USA:  ACCET

References
Notes

Education companies of the United Kingdom

pt:Kaplan, Inc.